Ján Ševčík (Brezolupy, 13 February 1896 - Bratislava, 6 March 1965) was a Czechoslovak politician.

Ševčík participated in the Czechoslovak Legion during World War I. After the war he studied law and from 1926 to 1934 represented the Slovak People's Party (incl. as secretary of the faction). After that, he worked in the agrarian sector.

From 1939 to 1942 he was the head of the YMCA administration in Bratislava.

Ševčík was an opponent of fascism and therefore joined the Slovak résistance movement. The Slovak résistance opposed the nominally independent Slovak republic that was established in 1939 by monseigneur Jozef Tiso but to a large extent controlled by Germans. In 1944 the Slovak National Uprising took place, in which Ševčík participated. The résistance forces met an early success in fighting with Slovak fascists and German troops, but later had to retreat.

After World War II Ševčík joined the Democratic Party (DS). The DS won the  1946 election in the Slovak part of Czechoslovakia and thereafter had to share power with the Communist Party of Slovakia (KSS). Ševčík became a deputy once more. The communists carried out a 'great purge' of DS members in 1946–1948. After the communist coup d'état in February 1948, the DS was banned and replaced by the Party of Slovak Revival (SSO), a pro-communist satellite party. Ševčík became the chairman of the SSO and at the same time vice-premier in Antonín Zápotocký's cabinet.

In 1952 Ján Ševčík was arrested and accused of opposition to the socialist development of Czechoslovakia. He was sentenced to imprisonment. In 1960 he was released. On 6 March 1965 Ševčík died. He was re-habilitated soon after that.

1896 births
1965 deaths
People from Bánovce nad Bebravou District
People from the Kingdom of Hungary
Slovak People's Party politicians
Republican Party of Farmers and Peasants politicians
Democratic Party (Slovakia, 1944) politicians
Party of Slovak Revival politicians
Members of the Interim National Assembly of Czechoslovakia
Members of the Constituent National Assembly of Czechoslovakia
Members of the National Assembly of Czechoslovakia (1948–1954)
YMCA leaders
Czechoslovak Legion personnel
Czechoslovak Socialist Republic rehabilitations